The 1990 NCAA Division I men's basketball tournament involved 64 schools playing in single-elimination play to determine the national champion of NCAA Division I men's college basketball. It began on March 15, 1990, and ended with the championship game on April 2 in Denver, Colorado. A total of 63 games were played.

UNLV, coached by Jerry Tarkanian, won the national title with a 103–73 victory in the final game over Duke, coached by Mike Krzyzewski. In doing so, UNLV set the NCAA Division I men's basketball tournament record for largest margin of victory in a championship game.  UNLV's win marks the last time a school from a non-power conference has won the championship game. Anderson Hunt of UNLV was named the tournament's Most Outstanding Player.

This tournament is also remembered for an emotional run by Loyola Marymount in the West regional. In the quarterfinals of the West Coast Conference tournament against the Portland Pilots, Lions star forward Hank Gathers collapsed and died due to a heart condition. The WCC tournament was immediately suspended, with the regular-season champion Lions given the conference's automatic bid. The team defeated New Mexico State, then laid a 34-point thrashing on defending national champion Michigan, and defeated Alabama in the Sweet Sixteen (the only game in which Loyola Marymount did not score 100 or more points in the tournament) before running into eventual champion UNLV in the regional final. Gathers' childhood friend Bo Kimble, the team's undisputed floor leader in the wake of the tragedy, paid tribute to his friend by attempting his first free throw in each game left-handed despite being right-handed. (Gathers was right-handed, but struggled so much with free throws that he tried shooting them left-handed for a time.) Kimble made all of his left-handed attempts in the tournament.

The tournament employed a new timing system borrowed from FIBA & the NBA: when the game was played in an NBA arena, the final minute of the period is measured in tenths-seconds, rather than whole seconds as in previous years.

Schedule and venues

The following are the sites that were selected to host each round of the 1990 tournament, and their host(s):

First and Second Rounds
 March 15 and 17
 East Region
 Hartford Civic Center, Hartford, Connecticut (Host: University of Connecticut)
 Midwest Region
 Frank Erwin Center, Austin, Texas (Host: University of Texas at Austin)
 Southeast Region
 Thompson–Boling Arena, Knoxville, Tennessee (Host: University of Tennessee)
 West Region
 Jon M. Huntsman Center, Salt Lake City, Utah (Host: University of Utah)
 March 16 and 18
 East Region
 Omni Coliseum, Atlanta, Georgia (Host: Georgia Tech)
 Midwest Region
 Hoosier Dome, Indianapolis, Indiana (Hosts: Butler University, Midwestern Collegiate Conference)
 Southeast Region
 Richmond Coliseum, Richmond, Virginia (Hosts: University of Richmond, Virginia Commonwealth University)
 West Region
 Long Beach Arena, Long Beach, California (Host: Long Beach State University)

Regional semifinals and finals (Sweet Sixteen and Elite Eight)
 March 22 and 24
 East Regional, Brendan Byrne Arena, East Rutherford, New Jersey (Hosts: Seton Hall University, Big East Conference)
 Midwest Regional, Reunion Arena, Dallas, Texas (Host: Southwest Conference)
 March 23 and 25
 Southeast Regional, Louisiana Superdome, New Orleans, Louisiana (Hosts: Tulane University, University of New Orleans)
 West Regional, Oakland–Alameda County Coliseum Arena, Oakland, California (Host: University of California, Berkeley)

National semifinals and championship (Final Four and championship)
 March 31 and April 2
 McNichols Sports Arena, Denver, Colorado (Hosts: University of Colorado Boulder, Big 8 Conference)

Denver became the 23rd host city, and McNichols Sports Arena the 26th host venue, for the Final Four, the only time it has hosted. Two new cities, Oakland, California and Richmond, Virginia, became host cities in 1990. Games had not been played in the East Bay region since 1958 when Cal's Men's Gym (now Haas Pavilion) hosted; the tournament has returned twice since. Richmond became the third city in Virginia, after Blacksburg and Williamsburg, to host tournament games; like the previous cities it has only hosted twice. Additionally, the tournament returned to Knoxville for the first time since 1983, this time at the new Thompson–Boling Arena. This year also marked the second and, to date, last appearance of the Long Beach Arena in the tournament; with newer, larger venues in Los Angeles and Anaheim, it is unlikely to return soon. Any future tournament games to be played in the San Francisco area would be played at SAP Center or Chase Center & in Denver at the Ball Arena.

Teams

Bracket

East Regional – East Rutherford, New Jersey

* – denotes overtime period

Regional Final summary

Midwest Regional – Dallas, Texas

Regional Final summary

Southeast Regional – New Orleans, Louisiana

* – denotes overtime period

Regional Final summary

West Regional – Oakland, California

* – denotes overtime period

Regional Final summary

Final Four – Denver, Colorado

Game summaries

National Championship

Announcers
CBS and NCAA Productions broadcast all tournament games.
 Brent Musburger and Billy Packer – First round (Ohio State–Providence) at Salt Lake City, Utah; Second Round at Austin, Texas and Richmond, Virginia; West Regional at Oakland, California; Final Four at Denver, Colorado. Musburger's final games for CBS.
 Dick Stockton and Hubie Brown – Second Round at Atlanta, Georgia; East Regional at East Rutherford, New Jersey
 James Brown and Bill Raftery – Second Round at Hartford, Connecticut and Indianapolis, Indiana; Midwest Regional at Dallas, Texas
 Greg Gumbel and Quinn Buckner – First round (New Mexico State–Loyola-Marymount) and Second Round at Long Beach, California; Southeast Regional at New Orleans, Louisiana
 Brad Nessler and Tom Heinsohn – Second Round at Knoxville, Tennessee
 Tim Brant and Len Elmore – Second Round at Salt Lake City, Utah
 Bob Carpenter and Clark Kellogg – First round (Indiana–California, Clemson–Brigham Young) at Hartford, Connecticut
 Mike Gorman and Ron Perry – First round (La Salle–Southern Mississippi) at Hartford, Connecticut
 Fred White and Larry Conley – First round (St. John's–Temple, Kansas–Robert Morris) at Atlanta, Georgia
 Ralph Hacker and Dan Belluomini – First round (UCLA–UAB) at Atlanta, Georgia
 Ron Franklin and Bob Ortegel – First round (North Carolina–SW Missouri State, Arkansas–Princeton) at Austin, Texas
 Tom Hammond and Gary Thompson – First round (Georgetown–Texas Southern, Georgia–Texas) at Indianapolis, Indiana
 Mick Hubert and Gary Thompson – First round (Xavier–Kansas State) at Indianapolis, Indiana; First round (Arizona–South Florida) at Long Beach, California
 Mike Patrick and Dan Bonner – First round (Missouri–Northern Iowa, Syracuse–Coppin State) at Richmond, Virginia
 Bob Rathbun and Bucky Waters – First round (Minnesota–UTEP) at Richmond, Virginia
 Bob Rathbun and Mimi Griffin – First round (Virginia–Notre Dame) at Richmond, Virginia
 Wayne Larrivee and Bruce Larson – First round (UNLV–Arkansas-Little Rock, Oregon State–Ball State) at Salt Lake City, Utah
 John Sanders and Len Elmore – First round (Louisville–Idaho) at Salt Lake City, Utah
 Barry Tomkins and Mike Rice – First round (Alabama–Colorado State, Michigan–Illinois State) at Long Beach, California

Tournament notes 
 Loyola Marymount's 149–115 win over Michigan set a new tournament record for most combined points (264).
 UNLV's 103–73 win over Duke marked the first, (and to date, only), time in the history of the tournament that at least 100 points were scored in the championship game.
 UNLV's 571 points over six games set the record for most points scored by a single team in any one year of the tournament.
 UNLV is the only team in tournament history to average more than 95 points per game, over six games. In six tournament games, they won three by exactly 30 points, while scoring more than 100 points in each 30-point victory.
 UNLV and UCLA in 1965 are the only teams in tournament history to win three games all while scoring at least 100 points in each win. (Loyola Marymount also scored at least 100 points in three games in the 1990 tournament, but lost their last game, where they scored 101 points, to UNLV, by 30 points. UNLV also scored at least 100 points in three victories in the 1977 tournament, but their last one was in the Final Four consolation game.)
 UNLV's 30-point margin of victory in the championship game is also a tournament record. ESPN called it the 36th “worst blowout in sports history.”
 To date, UNLV remains the last team from a non-power conference (AAC, ACC, Big East, Big Ten, Big 12, Pac-12, and SEC) to win the national championship, since Louisville in 1986. (Louisville was in The Metro Conference in 1986, which was considered a major basketball conference throughout its history, 1975 - 1995.)
 The championship game was UNLV’s eleventh-consecutive win. They would eventually run the win streak to an astounding 45 games. That is the fourth-longest win streak in NCAA Division 1 basketball history, and the longest win streak since the longest one ever, by UCLA, ended in 1974.

See also
 1990 NCAA Division II men's basketball tournament
 1990 NCAA Division III men's basketball tournament
 1990 NCAA Division I women's basketball tournament
 NCAA Division II women's basketball tournament
 NCAA Division III women's basketball tournament
 1990 National Invitation Tournament
 National Women's Invitation Tournament
 1990 NAIA Division I men's basketball tournament
 NAIA Division I women's basketball tournament

References

NCAA Division I men's basketball tournament
NCAA
Basketball competitions in Denver
Bronco Colorado
Basketball competitions in Austin, Texas
Basketball in the Dallas–Fort Worth metroplex
1990s in Denver
NCAA Division I men's basketball tournament
NCAA Division I men's basketball tournament